{{DISPLAYTITLE:C3H6O3}}
The molecular formula C3H6O3 may refer to:
 Dihydroxyacetone
 Dimethyl carbonate
 Glyceraldehyde
 3-Hydroxypropionic acid
 Lactic acid
 Trioxanes
 1,2,4-Trioxane
 1,3,5-Trioxane